Country ham is a variety of heavily salted ham preserved by curing and smoking, associated with the cuisine of the Southern United States.

Production
Country hams are salt-cured (with or without nitrites) for one to three months. They are usually hardwood smoked (usually hickory and red oak), but some types of country ham, such as the "salt-and-pepper ham" of North Carolina, are not smoked. Missouri country hams traditionally incorporate brown sugar in their cure mix and are known to be milder and less salty than hams produced in more eastern states such as Kentucky and Virginia. They are then aged for several months to 3 years, depending on the fat content of the meat.

See also

 List of dried foods
 List of hams
 List of smoked foods
 Smithfield ham, a type of country ham.

References

Further reading
 Megan E. Edwards. "Virginia Ham: The Local and Global of Colonial Foodways". Food and Foodways 19 (Jan. 2011). pp. 56–73.

Ham
Dried meat
Cuisine of the Southern United States
Smoked meat